Clamecy may refer to:
 Clamecy, Aisne, France
 Clamecy, Nièvre, France

See also 
 Roman Catholic Diocese of Bethléem à Clamecy